Claudia Gerhardt (born 18 January 1966) is a retired German athlete who specialised in the long jump. She represented her country at two indoor and one outdoor World Championships. In addition, she won the bronze medal at the 1996 European Indoor Championships.

Her personal bests in the event are 6.82 metres outdoors (0.0 m/s, Gladbeck 1996) and 6.83 metres indoors (Dortmund 1996).

Competition record

References

1966 births
Living people
German female long jumpers
World Athletics Championships athletes for Germany